Samantha Walters may refer to:

Samantha Browne-Walters, actress 
Samantha Walters, character in Cold Squad

See also
Samantha Waters (disambiguation)
Samuel Walters (disambiguation)